Melaspilea is a genus of lichen-forming and lichenicolous fungi in the family Melaspileaceae. The genus was circumscribed by Finnish lichenologist William Nylander in 1857.

Species
Melaspilea amarkantakensis 
Melaspilea amota 
Melaspilea arthonioides 
Melaspilea atacamensis 
Melaspilea atroides  – Europe
Melaspilea bagliettoana 
Melaspilea chilena  – South America
Melaspilea congregans 
Melaspilea congregantula 
Melaspilea constrictella 
Melaspilea coquimbensis 
Melaspilea diplasiospora 
Melaspilea enteroleuca 
Melaspilea galligena  – Russia
Melaspilea gemella 
Melaspilea granitophila 
Melaspilea hyparctica 
Melaspilea interjecta 
Melaspilea lecideopsoidea 
Melaspilea leciographoides 
Melaspilea lekae 
Melaspilea lentiginosa 
Melaspilea lentiginosula 
Melaspilea leucina 
Melaspilea mangrovei 
Melaspilea microcarpa 
Melaspilea ochrothalamia 
Melaspilea opegraphoides 
Melaspilea santiagensis  – South America
Melaspilea saxicola  – South America
Melaspilea stellaris 
Melaspilea sudzuhensis 
Melaspilea tucumana 
Melaspilea urceolata 
Melaspilea zerovii

References

Dothideomycetes genera
Lichen genera
Lichenicolous fungi
Taxa described in 1857
Taxa named by William Nylander (botanist)
Dothideomycetes